Petar Aleksandrov Aleksandrov (born 7 December 1962) is a Bulgarian football coach and former player.

As a footballer Aleksandrov played for various clubs in Bulgaria, Belgium, Germany and Switzerland during the 1980s and 1990s. He was a striker, noted for his goal-scoring ability. Aleksandrov was capped 25 times for the Bulgaria national team, scoring 5 goals, and played in the 1994 FIFA World Cup.

Club career
Born in Karlovo, Aleksandrov started playing professionally with home-town club Levski Karlovo in 1981 before moving to PFC Slavia Sofia a year later. He played at Slavia for seven years and helped the club win the Balkans Cup in 1986 and 1988, and secure third-placed finishes in 1982 and 1986. For Slavia Aleksandrov played in 173 matches and scored 100 goals. In 1989, he signed for the Belgian First Division's K.V. Kortrijk where his form earned him a move to FC Energie Cottbus of East Germany in 1990. He struggled there, however, and moved on to FC Aarau in the Swiss Super League after just one season. He was a major success at Aarau before he made his way back to Bulgaria to play for PFC Levski Sofia. Despite his excellent goal record, he played at Levski for just one and a half seasons as he returned to Switzerland with Neuchâtel Xamax in January 1995. The following January, he signed for FC Luzern and he went on to play over fifty league matches for the club before going to FC Aarau for a second spell in 1998. In 2000, he played for FC Basel for a short while before dropping down to the Swiss lower leagues where he continued to play for another two years with Kickers Luzern and Blue Star Zürich.

International career
Aleksandrov was capped 25 times by the Bulgaria national team and was part of the squad that reached the semi-finals of the 1994 World Cup. His international debut came in a 0–0 draw with Scotland on 10 September 1987 and he went on to score five international goals. Aleksandrov came on as a substitute for the last ten minutes in the memorable 2–1 away win over France on 17 November 1993, which secured Bulgaria's qualification for the 1994 World Cup.

International goals
Scores and results list Bulgaria's goal tally first, score column indicates score after each Aleksandrov goal.

Coaching career
After his retirement from playing, Aleksandrov stayed in Switzerland and managed the reserve squad of FC Aarau from 2002 until 2004 when he became the assistant manager of Greek side PAOK F.C. In 2006, he was appointed as fellow countryman Krasimir Balakov's assistant at FC St. Gallen but he left after a few months to join the coaching staff at Grasshopper Club Zürich. In 2008, Plamen Markov named him as his assistant at the Bulgaria national team.

Honours
Slavia Sofia
 Balkans Cup: 1986, 1988

FC Aarau
 Swiss Nationalliga A: 1992–93

Levski Sofia
 A Group: 1993–94
 Bulgarian Cup: 1993–94

Individual
 Swiss Nationalliga A top scorer: 1994–95 (24 goals), 1995–96 (19 goals)
 Foreigner of the Year in Switzerland: 1994–95

References

External links
 
 Profile at Levskisofia.info 

Living people
1962 births
People from Karlovo
Association football forwards
Bulgarian footballers
Bulgaria international footballers
1994 FIFA World Cup players
FC Levski Karlovo players
PFC Slavia Sofia players
K.V. Kortrijk players
FC Energie Cottbus players
FC Aarau players
PFC Levski Sofia players
Neuchâtel Xamax FCS players
FC Luzern players
FC Baden players
First Professional Football League (Bulgaria) players
Swiss Super League players
DDR-Oberliga players
Bulgarian expatriate footballers
Expatriate footballers in East Germany
Expatriate footballers in Switzerland
Bulgarian expatriate sportspeople in Switzerland
Bulgarian football managers
Bulgarian expatriate football managers